Getting Near to Baby is a 1999 children's novel by Audrey Couloumbis. It was awarded a Newbery Honor in 2000 and is an ALA Notable Children's Book. The book's target age range is for readers between the ages of 10 to 14. Getting Near to Baby was influenced by the author's personal experience as a child, as her aunt experienced the death of her child due to cystic fibrosis. At the same time a family living nearby had died of a bacterial illness by drinking tainted water.

Plot summary
In the novel, the characters Willa Jo and Little Sister are dealing with their grief after the passing of their baby sister who drank contaminated water. Their mother is unable to handle her own feelings of dejection while caring for the two girls and her sister takes them to stay with her, Patty. Aunt Patty has no children, and her household is full of rules. Aside from moving into a home with their aunt, things become even more difficult for the girls due to the fact that Aunt Patty does not fully understand them.

When Willa Jo and Little Sister climb up on Aunt Patty's roof to watch the sunrise, then decide not to come down for a while, Patty realizes she has not been fulfilling the girls' emotional needs. Willa Jo reflects on her time at her Aunt Patty's house, like meeting Liz, the Piggly-Wiggly pickle, and much more.

Characters
Baby: Baby is the youngest child of Noreen. She drank contaminated water at a carnival, was sick through the night, and died in her mother's arms the next morning.
Noreen: Noreen is the mother of Willa Jo, Baby, and Little Sister. After the passing of her youngest daughter, the grief almost seems unbearable. Noreen sends Willa Jo and little sister to Noreen’s sister Patty’s house
Willa Jo: Willa Jo is thirteen years old and ends up living with her Aunt Patty after the passing of her baby sister. In the story, Aunt Patty calls Willa Jo by her full name, Willa Jo Dean.
Little Sister: Little Sisters real name is Jo Ann but everyone calls her little sister. Little Sister is seven years old and also goes to live with Aunt Patty after the passing of her baby sister. As a result of Baby's death, she has ceased to speak.
Aunt Patty: Aunt Patty is Noreen's older sister. Throughout the story, Patty comes off as very controlling, having several rules in her household. According to Willa Jo, Aunt Patty is described as a short and wide woman.
Uncle Hob: Uncle Hob is Aunt Patty’s husband. He is more calm and relaxed than his wife, who tends to come off a bit controlling at times.

Reviews of the book 
"Couloumbis' first novel wears its heart on one sleeve and its humor on the other. Together, they make a splendid fit."  - Booklist, boxed review

"Willa Jo tells the tale in a nonlinear, back-and-forth fashion that not only prepares readers emotionally for her heartrending account of Baby's death but also artfully illuminates each character's depths and foibles...The author creates a cast founded on likable, real-seeming people who grow and change in response to the tragedy."  - Kirkus Reviews, pointer review

Theatrical adaptation
A theatrical version of Getting Near to Baby was written by Y. York and premiered by People's Light and Theatre Company (Malvern, Pennsylvania) in 2008. The play has subsequently been produced at ChildsPlay (Tempe, Arizona) and Seattle Children's Theatre, and Riverwalk Theater.

References

External links
Reviews of the Theatrical Adaptation: audreycouloumbisbooks.com, Retrieved 1 September 2016.

1999 American novels
American children's novels
Newbery Honor-winning works
1999 children's books
American novels adapted into plays
Nonlinear narrative novels